Remax (Reparo de Metralhadora Automatizada X) is a Brazilian remote weapon system produced by CTEx (Brazilian Army engineers) and Ares Aeroespacial e Defesa S.A.  It's a flexible system able to receive many configurations, like 7.62×51mm NATO, 12.7 mm.  The system gives soldiers 360° capacity and is equipped with night vision, thermal vision, high resolution camera and zoom.  The project is in advanced stage. From now on, only minor modifications will be made in order to reduce the weight of the system, thus improving their performance.

Remax will be used with the Guarani, the next Brazilian armored personnel carrier.

Development
The Remax has been developed incrementally:
 Phase I: allowed day shooting with 12.7 mm (.50 in) machine guns;
 Phase II: the system could alternatively employ 7.62 mm machine guns;
 Phase III: added night vision equipment, and;
 Phase IV: the system will be stabilized to allow shooting from a moving car.

See also
CROWS
SWARM
Raven Srws
Protector (RWS)

References

External links
 https://www.youtube.com/watch?v=ySdKSGnpU-o ( LAAD 2009 "civilian test")
 http://defesabrasil.com

Weapons of Brazil
Trial and research firearms
Remote weapon stations